Advanced Design System (ADS) is an electronic design automation software system produced by PathWave Design, a division of Keysight Technologies. It provides an integrated design environment to designers of RF electronic products such as mobile phones, pagers, wireless networks, satellite communications, radar systems, and high-speed data links.

Keysight ADS supports every step of the design process — schematic capture, layout, design rule checking, frequency-domain and time-domain circuit simulation, and electromagnetic field simulation — allowing the engineer to fully characterize and optimize an RF design without changing tools.

Keysight has donated copies of the ADS software to the electrical engineering departments at many universities.

See also

 Momentum (electromagnetic simulator) — 3D Planar EM simulator element of ADS platforms
 FEM Element — Arbitrary 3D geometry EM simulator element of ADS platforms

Notes
The deprecated Tektronix ADS is another, unrelated, electronic design automation system composed of TekSpice and QuickIC.

External links

Agilent ADS tutorial and forum EM Talk
ADS Basics Playlist - Keysight Technologies
 30-Second Demos of user-inspired innovations in Advanced Design System (ADS 2014)

Electronic design automation software
Electronic circuit simulators
Electromagnetic simulation software